Radio Borders is an Independent Local Radio station based in Edinburgh, Scotland, owned and operated by Bauer as part of the Hits Radio Network. It broadcasts to the Scottish Borders and north Northumberland. 

As of December 2022, the station has a weekly audience of 45,000 listeners according to RAJAR. 

From 3 April 2023, Radio Borders will become Greatest Hits Radio Scottish Borders and North Northumberland.

Programming
Networked programming originates from Clyde 1 in Clydebank, Forth 1 in Edinburgh and Hits Radio in Manchester.

Local programming is produced and broadcast from Radio Forth's Edinburgh studios on weekdays from 6-10am, presented by Gregor Runciman and Lynsey Gibson.

News and sport
Radio Borders broadcasts local news bulletins hourly from 6am to 7pm on weekdays and from 7am to 1pm on Saturdays and Sundays. Headlines are broadcast on the half-hour during weekday breakfast and drivetime shows, including sports reports. Traffic bulletins are presenter led and broadcast at 20 and 40 minutes past the hour between 6am and 9am as well as between 4pm and 7pm.

Local news bulletins are produced in conjunction with Radio Forth's newsroom in Edinburgh and Metro Radio's newsroom in Newcastle.

National bulletins from Sky News Radio are carried overnight with bespoke networked Scottish bulletins at weekends, produced from Radio Clyde's newsroom in Clydebank.

References

External links
 
 
 
 
 

Bauer Radio
Hits Radio
Radio stations in North East England
Radio stations in Scotland
Radio stations established in 1990
Anglo-Scottish border
1990 establishments in Scotland